Cemetery Without Crosses,  is a 1969  Spaghetti Western film by Robert Hossein, its director, co-screenwriter and star.

Plot
Will Rogers, the patriarch of a wealthy cattle ranching family, forces the sheep farming Caine brothers — Ben, Thomas, and Eli — to sell off their livestock. In retaliation, the Caines steal a shipment of gold coins intended for the Rogers; during their escape, Ben is wounded. Thomas and Eli ride to their ranch, while Ben, upon returning to his home, is ambushed by the Rogers and lynched as his wife, Maria, is forced by Will's sons to watch. The Rogers then ride to Thomas and Eli's ranch and burn down their house. The brothers ride to Maria's home to find her burying her husband, and give her a third-share of the stolen money.

Driven by revenge, Maria take the money to a ghost town surrounded by dunes, where she meets its lone inhabitant, Manuel. A gunfighter with a fetishistic habit of wearing a black leather glove in duels, Manuel had once shared a romantic relationship with Maria and a friendship with Ben, but he left the pair to marry in order to suppress his violent nature. Maria asks him to avenge Ben on her behalf — although reluctant and skeptical, Manuel accepts her offer.

Manuel rides to a nearby town and stays at a hotel that Will's sons frequent. In the saloon, vigilantes from the rival Vallee family confront and attack the Rogers brothers in an attempt to run them out of town; Manuel kills the Vallees, and is quickly arrested. The next morning, the Rogers brothers bribe the sheriff into releasing Manuel, and take him to the family ranch. Thankful for saving his sons, Will provides Manuel a job as the ranch's foreman. That night, Manuel dines with the Rogers and their ranch hands, during which he opens a jar of mustard to find a jack-in-the-box, resulting in both dinner tables erupting with laughter as they accept him as their friend.

Later, Manuel opens the ranch's corral and frees the horses; during the commotion as the Rogers try to pursue their mounts, he kidnaps Diana, Will's teenage daughter, and takes her to the ghost town. Thomas and Eli rape Diana, while Maria and Manuel, growing increasingly impassioned and uncomfortable with the situation that is transpiring, wait outside in the street. Maria rides to the Rogers ranch and demands that they re-bury Ben in the town cemetery in exchange for Diana's life. They begrudgingly accept, and provide Ben with a sizeable funeral procession and burial. Thomas and Eli, fearing that Maria's revenge scheme will result in disaster, attempt to convince Manuel to surrender Diana to them, but they are forced to leave when he threatens to kill them.

The Rogers capture the Caine brothers; in exchange for $2000, Thomas offers to return Diana to her family that night. His attempt to surprise Maria and Manuel fails, and they shoot him. Thomas' horse carrys his dead body to the rendezvous point, where Eli confesses that Diana is in the ghost town. Upon learning this, Will has him dragged to death by a horse. Maria and Manuel meanwhile leave the ghost town; Manuel takes Diana back to her family's ranch, while Maria returns to her home to wait for Manuel so that they can travel north and escape. However, the Rogers, believing that she and Manuel have killed Diana, are waiting for her. Manuel finds Maria mortally wounded; admitting that she had married Ben out of fear of not seeing Manuel again, she dies in his arms.

Manuel rides to the ghost town to see the Rogers waiting for him on one side of the street, and he guns them down in quick succession. Diana, on horseback and armed with a rifle, witnesses the duel. Manuel removes his "killing glove", disarms himself and confronts Diana, who shoots him and rides away as he collapses onto the sand and dies.

Cast

Production
Cemetery Without Crosses was shot in the Almería desert in early 1968. Dario Argento is credited as co-screenwriter in the film, while  Hossein insists Argento had nothing to do with it.

The score was composed by the director's father, André Hossein, while the theme song "The Rope and the Colt" is sung by Scott Walker and released as a single in France.
The film is dedicated to Sergio Leone, who directed the scene in which Manuel dines with the Rogers.

Release
Cemetery Without Crosses was released in France in February 1969.

The film was released by Arrow Video in the United Kingdom and United States on Blu-Ray and DVD on July 20, 2015.

Reception
From retrospective reviews, Alex Cox discussed the film in Film Comment, stating that the film "holds its own against art westerns like Once Upon a Time in the West and El Topo" specifically noting Henri Persin's cinematography and Jean Mandaroux's production design.

James Blackford discussed the release in Sight & Sound, stating that where "Leone exaggerated the western's traits with virtuoso style and grandiouse mise en scene, Hossein's approach is more to distill the genre." Blackford compared the film to the work of Jean-Pierre Melville, noting the film was "marked by long periods without dialogue and an intense focus on essential images. In this filmic space, every pronounced camera movement, musical cue and look exchanged by the characters heightens the melodrama. The result is a compellingly pure take on the western, true to the tradition of French popular cinema."

Notes

References

External links
 
Cemetery without Crosses at Allmovie

Spaghetti Western films
1969 Western (genre) films
French Western (genre) films
Italian Western (genre) films
1969 films
Films shot in Almería
1960s French-language films
1960s Italian films
1960s French films